Zakhmo Ka Hisaab is a 1993 Indian Hindi-language film produced and directed by Talukdars. It stars Govinda, Farah in pivotal roles.

Plot
Suraj (Govinda) lives with his parents viz, dad (Alok Nath), mom Savitri (Seema Deo), sister Pooja (Parijat), elder brother Amar, his sister-in-law, and a niece and nephew. Amar is employed in the Persian gulf and sends some money so that the family can find a suitable groom for Pooja. When Suraj goes to deposit the money in the bank, some bank robbers intercept him and take his money. Since the money was not deposited in the bank, the bank is unable to guarantee the amount. Suraj does not share this info with his family, so that they needn't worry. Suraj goes in search of the culprits and meets up with a petty thief and pick-pocket Bindiya (Farha). He feels sorry for her, and takes her home and introduces her to his family, and promises to marry her. His family accepts Bindiya. When the family hear of Amar passing away, they ask Suraj to get the money from the bank. How will Suraj get money from the bank, when there is no money in there? How will the knowledge that the money was stolen effect his family? Will Pooja ever get married?

Cast
Govinda as Suraj 
Farah as Bindiya
Kader Khan as Gyani
Aruna Irani as Kamini 
Aloknath as Kailashnath
Seema Deo as Savitri 
Adi Irani as Inspector Avinash
Kiran Kumar as Dhaneshwar
Vikram Gokhale as Professor Adarsh Kumar
Rajan Sippy as Amarnath
Rakesh Bedi as Gyani's Assistant 
Dinesh Hingoo as Malhotra 
Mahavir Shah as Dhaneshwar's son

Music
Anwar Sagar wrote all the songs.

References

External links

1990s Hindi-language films
1993 films
Films scored by Rajesh Roshan